Claude Corbo (born 1945 in Montreal) is a political scientist. He is from an Italian father and a Québécois mother, was a university professor in political science, a university administrator, and the rector of the Université du Québec à Montréal.

Biography
Professor in the Department of Political Science at the Université du Québec à Montréal since its creation in 1969, Corbo occupied several positions at the heart of this university through his entire career. Among many other positions, he was vice dean of humanities from 1972 to 1974, registrar from 1974 to 1978, dean of resource management from 1978 to 1979, vice rector from 1979 to 1981, and vice rector of academics and research from 1981 to 1986. Claude Corbo then accessed the position of rector of the institution in 1986.  He served as rector for ten years until 1996, which marked his return to teaching. Since January 7, 2008, he is once again the rector of the UQAM.

References

External links
Claude Corbo, candidat au rectorat de l'UQAM

Academic staff of the Université du Québec à Montréal
1945 births
Academics from Montreal
Living people
Université de Montréal alumni